Haley Alexis Pullos (born July 10, 1998) is an American actress. She is known for her role as Molly Lansing-Davis in the American daytime soap opera General Hospital. She also plays Bella in The Expanding Universe of Ashley Garcia.

Life and career
Haley Alexis Pullos was born on July 10, 1998 in San Jose, California. She has two brothers and two sisters. Besides her recurring role on General Hospital, she has also appeared in the pilot episode of Dollhouse, as well as a recurring role as young Melinda in Ghost Whisperer. In 2013, she appears in the ad "Little Tricks" for Yoplait. She also appeared on Season 7 Episode 13 "Two Stories" on the TV show House.

Filmography

Film

Television

Awards and nominations

References

External links

1998 births
Living people
Actresses from California
American soap opera actresses
American television actresses
American child actresses
American film actresses
Actresses from Palo Alto, California
21st-century American women